The 2018 VBA season was the third season of the Vietnam Basketball Association. The regular season began on June 16, 2018 and ended on August 16, 2018. The playoffs began on August 21, 2018 and ended on August 26, 2018. The finals began on September 4, 2018 and ended on September 9, 2018 with Cantho Catfish beating Hanoi Buffaloes in 3 games.

Teams

Venues and locations

Personnel and sponsorship

Managerial changes

Import players
Each team is allowed 2 heritage players and 1 foreign player.

Draft

Regular season

Standings

Playoffs

Statistics

Team statistics
Points per game: Cantho Catfish (85.80)
Field goal %: Cantho Catfish, Hanoi Buffaloes, Saigon Heat (44%)
3-point field goal %: Hochiminh City Wings (35%)
Rebounds per game: Thang Long Warriors (40.35)
Assists per game: Cantho Catfish (17.65)
Steals per game: Thang Long Warriors (12.41)
Blocks per game: Cantho Catfish (3.85)
Turnovers per game: Hanoi Buffaloes (18.25)

Awards

Yearly awards
Fans of the year: Cantho Catfish
Local referee of the year: Triệu Chí Thành
Young player of the year: Võ Kim Bản (Saigon Heat)
Sixth man of the year: Đặng Thái Hưng (Thang Long Warriors)
Sportsmanship award: Henry Nguyen (Hochiminh City Wings)
Defensive player of the year: Mike Bell (Hanoi Buffaloes)
Most favorite player of the year: Vincent Nguyen (Hanoi Buffaloes)
Local player of the year: Nguyễn Phú Hoàng (Cantho Catfish)
Heritage player of the year: Chris Dierker (Danang Dragons)
Most valuable player of the year: DeAngelo Hamilton (Cantho Catfish)
Coach of the year: Kevin Yurkus (Cantho Catfish)

MVP of the Week

References

Footnotes

External links
 Official website

Vietnam Basketball Association seasons
2018–19 in Vietnamese basketball
2018–19 in Asian basketball leagues